Oldcastle is an unincorporated community in the town of Tecumseh, Ontario, Canada. It is bounded to the north by Highway 3, to the east by the Chrysler Canada Greenway trail, to the south by County Road 8 (Townline), and to the west by Howard Avenue. It is the starting point of the Chrysler Canada Greenway rail trail. Its western half consists primarily of industries and businesses, while the remaining area is farmland and residential.

Business 

It is home to Ciociaro Club of Windsor, the largest Italian Club in Southwestern Ontario.

Wrestling
The community was known as a venue for Border City Wrestling from 1995 to 2005 and even hosted BCW Can-Am Tag Team Championship events with such notable wrestlers as Tommy Dreamer, Brooklyn Brawler, Johnny Swinger, Cyrus and Terry Taylor. Wrestling was held at the Ciociaro Club on Talbot Road and drew as much as 1,000 people to the matches.

On March 3, 2001, Tommy Dreamer defeated Scott D'Amore and Rhyno in 3-way match to win the Heavyweight Title. In a controversial match on March 12, 2002, Scott D'Amore and Sabu defeated Taylor and Cyrus to win the titles, however, since Sabu, who replaced Simon Diamond as D'Amore's partner last minute, was not officially in the match, the match was declared non-title, and the titles were returned to Taylor and Cyrus.

Fibre Internet 

In 2012 MNSi Telecom started installing optical fiber cable Internet service to Walkerville with a gradual roll-out of upgrades through to 2020. The Walkerville upgrade is part of an expected investment of more than $35 million. As of 2016, the service is available in Walkerville, Oldcastle, and East Windsor.

Notable people

Oldcastle is the hometown of retired Winnipeg Jets forward Kyle Wellwood and his brother Eric who was a Philadelphia Flyers prospect.

External links 

 City of Windsor
 Community of Windsor, Ontario – Community Living Resources Windsor ON, Canada

References 

Communities in Essex County, Ontario